Hon. Phillip Calvert (c. 1626 - c. December 22, 1682), also known as Hon. Philip Calvert, was the fifth Governor of Maryland during a brief period in 1660 or 1661. He was appointed by the royally chartered proprietor of Maryland, Charles Calvert, 3rd Baron Baltimore (1637–1715), as a caretaker to replace Lt. Gen Josias Fendall (1628–1682), the fifth/sixth? provincial governor.

Life
Calvert came to Maryland on the first expedition under first colonial governor Leonard Calvert (1606–1647), younger brother of the second Lord Baltimore Cecilius Calvert, 2nd Baron Baltimore (1605–1675). In 1656, he was made secretary of the Province and one of its Councillors. After the treason and overthrow of Governor Fendall, Calvert became governor in 1660, and displayed clemency in pardoning Fendall.

In 1661, Capt. Charles Calvert (1688–1734), illegitimate son of the Proprietor, was made Governor, and Philip was appointed Deputy-Lieutenant and Councillor of the Province. After this, he negotiated a treaty with the Dutch in which they agreed to abandon the disputed territory on the Delaware River. He was one of a committee which negotiated a treaty with the Indians, and of another commission which settled with the Virginia authorities a boundary line between Maryland and Virginia along the south shore of the Potomac River.

Family
He was son of George Calvert, first Lord Baltimore (1579–1632), and his second wife, Joane.

Calvert was married to Anne Wolsely Calvert. She died in 1680. He remarried to Jane Sewell Calvert, the step-daughter of his nephew Charles Calvert, 3rd Baron Baltimore. In 1682, Jane gave birth to a child of unknown name and gender. Philip Calvert and the infant both died in 1682. In 1990, the bodies of Phillip Calvert, Anne Wolsely Calvert, and the infant were found in lead coffins in a brick vault located in the ruins of a brick chapel in the "Chapel Field" in St. Mary's City, Maryland, the former colonial capital. Examination of these remains provided scientists and historians with significant insight regarding life in 17th century Maryland.  DNA analysis in 2016 showed the male adult and the infant have a father-son relationship, verifying the infant as a child of Phillip Calvert.  The baby is assessed to have died about three months after his father, in the spring of 1683, judging by the pine and oak pollen in the coffin.

See also
List of colonial governors of Maryland

References

External links
Calvert Family Tree (accessed 10 Jul 2013)

1626 births
1682 deaths
17th-century American people
Colonial Governors of Maryland
Phillip Calvert
Younger sons of barons